Xuecheng is a district and the seat of Zaozhuang, Shandong province, China, ever named by "lin cheng ". It has an area of 506.72 km2 and around 405,285 inhabitants (2003).

Administrative divisions
As 2012, this district is divided to 3 subdistricts and 6 towns.
Subdistricts
Lincheng Subdistrict
Xingren Subdistrict
Xingcheng Subdistrict

Towns

Climate

References

External links 
 Information page

County-level divisions of Shandong